Aamodt is a Norwegian surname. Notable people with the surname include:

 Aleksander Aamodt Kilde (born 1992), Norwegian alpine ski racer
 Bjørn Aamodt (1944–2006), Norwegian poet
 Christen Thorn Aamodt (1770–1836), Norwegian priest
 Henning Bue Aamodt, Norwegian footballer
 Kjetil André Aamodt (born 1971), Norwegian skier
 Michael Sevald Aamodt (1784–1859), Norwegian politician
 Mike Aamodt (born 1957), American psychologist
 Ragnhild Aamodt, Norwegian handball player
 Rannveig Aamodt, Norwegian rock climber

References 

Norwegian-language surnames